Russian Karaite may refer to:
Karaite Subbotniks, also described as Russian Karaites, adherents of Karaite Judaism
Crimean Karaites, adherents of Karaite Judaism in central and eastern Europe especially in the former Russian Empire